Raphael Carlo "Raphy" Reyes is a Filipino professional basketball player for Bicol Volcanoes of the Maharlika Pilipinas Basketball League (MPBL). He is a former UE Red Warrior and the point guard for the Big Chill Super Chargers in the PBA D-League. He was drafted 19th overall in the 2012 PBA draft by the Alaska Aces.

PBA career statistics

Correct as of September 18, 2016

Season-by-season averages

|-
| align=left | 
| align=left | Alaska
| 34 || 7.9 || .469 || .312 || .857 || .4 || .7 || .3 || .0 || 2.4
|-
| align=left | 
| align=left | Alaska
| 14 || 5.0 || .533 || .000 || .500 || .4 || .4 || .3 || .0 || 1.2
|-
| align=left | 
| align=left | Blackwater
| 21 || 16.5 || .396 || .317 || .759 || 1.3 || 1.6 || .4 || .0 || 5.3
|-
| align=left | 
| align=left | Blackwater
| 32 || 15.3 || .444 || .371 || .750 || 1.1 ||	.8 ||	.4 ||	.0 ||	5.0
|-class=sortbottom
| align=center colspan=2 | Career
| 101 || 11.6 || .438 || .342 || .779 || .8 || .9 || .4 || .0 || 3.7

References 

1987 births
Living people
Alaska Aces (PBA) players
Blackwater Bossing players
Filipino men's basketball players
Point guards
Basketball players from Manila
UE Red Warriors basketball players
Maharlika Pilipinas Basketball League players
Alaska Aces (PBA) draft picks